Bley is a surname. Notable people with the surname include:

João Punaro Bley (1900–1983), Brazilian military and public administrator
Paul Bley (1932–2016), contributor to the free jazz movement of the 1960s
Carla Bley (born 1936), American jazz composer, pianist, organist and band leader

See also
Blei
Blay (surname)